Edward I. Slupecki was a member of the Wisconsin State Assembly.

Biography
Slupecki was born on November 29, 1863 in Poznań, Poland. Later, he moved to Milwaukee, Wisconsin. He graduated from what is now Marquette University and served in what is now the Wisconsin Army National Guard.

Assembly career
Slupecki was elected to the Assembly in 1888. He was a Democrat.

References

1863 births
Year of death missing
Polish emigrants to the United States
Politicians from Poznań
Politicians from Milwaukee
Democratic Party members of the Wisconsin State Assembly
Wisconsin National Guard personnel
Marquette University alumni
Military personnel from Wisconsin
National Guard (United States) officers